Boswin is a hamlet in Cornwall, England, United Kingdom, situated in a former mining area south of Redruth. According to the Post Office the population of the hamlet was included in the civil parish of Wendron

References

External links

Hamlets in Cornwall